Opie Gets Laid, originally titled Sunnyvale for its film festival submissions, is a 2005 American independent romantic comedy film written and directed by James Ricardo and starring James Ricardo, April Wade, Ute Werner and Jesselynn Desmond.

Plot
At 30 years old, Opie (James Ricardo) is a virgin whose existence is made up of watching pornography and eating junk food. One day a drug dealer named Thai (April Wade) mistakenly comes to his door.  She decides to help Opie by finding him a good woman, initially (and unsuccessfully) by online personal ads. Thai and Opie end up sleeping together while high on marijuana, and then end up seeing each other regularly. Opie starts having sex with other women, including Thai's lesbian lover Dakota (Ute Werner) and a "gun-toting" nymphomaniac named Rain (Jesselynn Desmond).

Cast
 James Ricardo as Opie
 April Wade as Thai
 Ute Werner as Dakota
 Jesselynn Desmond as Rain
 Gina DeVettori as Alicia
 Samantha Turk as Randi
 Heidemarie Fuentes as Jackie
 Mark Wood as Travis
 Hutchi Hancock as Kimmy
 Ellen Hughes as Mom
 Peder Fedde as Dad
 Michael L. Connelly as Mike

Background
The film was shot at the Higgins Building in Los Angeles, in a New York City-style loft, and is partly autobiographical. According to writer/director James Ricardo, it was [originally] called Sunnyvale because he "didn't know what else to call it", and expanding, "Much like movie titles like Eraserhead. Sunnyvale is a comedic sounding title. It's a city that could only be in California."  Under its new title it is distributed by Vivendi Entertainment.

Recognition
The film was titled Sunnyvale during its film festival run and was the winner of the William Shatner Golden Groundhog Award for 'Best Underground Movie' of 2005. The award was described by critic Joshua Taylor as "maybe... just a veiled promotional tool for William Shatner's new DVD of the month club".

Critical response
SFist wrote that "...writer/director James Ricardo also starred in the movie and he was definitely the weakest of the actors. So it was hard to tell if it was just wooden acting that make Ricardo, the character, so passive or if he was intended to be. Talking to other filmgoers about it afterwards, we all seemed confused. No one really disliked it but everyone seemed unsure if they liked it really, or if they just wanted to like it."

DVD Talk offered that the film is "a lowbrow talking head comedy with a wittier than average script", and for "a first time director, Ricardo could have done much worse. His script is good, and he gets good performances from his three lead actresses."  In making comparisons between Ricardo and directors such as Woody Allen and Clint Eastwood who have acted in films they were also directing, they made note that Ricardo's own lead performance as a deadpan Opie was serviceable, but had a stiffness that a director not himself in front of the camera might have caught. They summarized by stating the film "is a quirky romantic comedy about sex that has no sex and stars a cast of unknowns. But if you can get past that, you should be entertained."

DVD Verdict noted that the title and packaging led to expectations of a cheapo sex comedy featuring "clichéd plot developments and plenty of gratuitous nudity", but that the film "feels more like a stage adaptation than anything else", with sexual content only being alluded to by dialogue scenes serving "as the 'before' and 'after' for dozens of brief but apparently successful sexual encounters" They commented that the "editing is tight, the dialogue is occasionally quite amusing, and the film rarely becomes terribly boring", noting there were "many individual attributes of merit here, so it's a little disappointing that the film as a whole doesn't quite gel." They commented that the character of Opie as written by Ricardo had much potential, but that as played by the director just was not interesting. They noted a paradox in that "Ricardo's performance suggests that he knows his writing is good", in that he "delivers the dialogue with a sort of smug assurance that feels more like a tell than like a natural extension of the character's personality". They concluded that the film "wins points for breaking some genre conventions", and that Ricardo and some of the other cast have potential for future films.

References

External links

2005 romantic comedy films
2005 films
American independent films
American LGBT-related films
American romantic comedy films
American sex comedy films
2000s English-language films
Female bisexuality in film
Films set in the 2000s
Films set in California
Films set in Los Angeles
Films shot in Los Angeles
Lesbian-related films
2000s sex comedy films
2005 directorial debut films
2005 independent films
2000s American films